Martell Mallett (born May 13, 1986) is a former Canadian football running back. He was signed by the BC Lions of the Canadian Football League (CFL) as a street free agent in 2009. He played college football at Arkansas at Pine Bluff.

Mallett has also been a member of the Cleveland Browns, Philadelphia Eagles, New York Giants, and Hamilton Tiger-Cats.

Mallett married his long time girlfriend, Jade, in 2017 and they recently had a son.

Professional career

BC Lions
On September 4, 2009, in a home game against the Montreal Alouettes, Mallett rushed for a franchise record 213 yards. He rushed for 1240 yards during the 2009 season and was a Western All-Star.

On November 26, 2009, Mallett was named the CFL's Most Outstanding Rookie of the Year.

Philadelphia Eagles
Mallett was signed by the Philadelphia Eagles on January 19, 2010. He was waived on July 31, 2010. He was re-signed on August 1. He was waived again on September 3, but was re-signed to the team's practice squad on September 5. He was released from the practice squad on September 21.

Cleveland Browns
Mallett was signed to the Cleveland Browns' practice squad on September 28, 2010. He was released on November 23, 2010.

Philadelphia Eagles
Mallett was re-signed to the Philadelphia Eagles' practice squad on January 5, 2011. His practice squad contract expired after the conclusion of the season.

New York Giants
Mallett was signed to a future contract by the New York Giants on January 11, 2011. On August 1, he was waived/injured by the Giants and after clearing waivers, was placed on injured reserve. He was released from injured reserve with an injury settlement on August 25.

Hamilton Tiger-Cats
Mallett returned to the CFL by signing with the Hamilton Tiger-Cats on January 30, 2012.  On June 6, 2012, Mallett tore his Achilles tendon during training camp. He did not play in the 2012 season. He was released by the Tiger-Cats on May 24, 2013.

Calgary Stampeders
Mallett signed with the Calgary Stampeders on February 9, 2014. He played his first professional game in over four years on August 1, 2014, rushing for over 100 yards in a game versus his former team, the B.C. Lions.

References

External links

Calgary Stampeders bio 
Philadelphia Eagles bio

1986 births
Living people
Sportspeople from Pine Bluff, Arkansas
Players of American football from Arkansas
African-American players of American football
African-American players of Canadian football
American football running backs
Canadian football running backs
Arkansas–Pine Bluff Golden Lions football players
BC Lions players
Philadelphia Eagles players
Cleveland Browns players
New York Giants players
Canadian Football League Rookie of the Year Award winners
Hamilton Tiger-Cats players
Calgary Stampeders players
21st-century African-American sportspeople
20th-century African-American people